EVR may refer to:

Companies and organizations
 Evercore (NYSE: EVR), an American independent investment banking advisory firm
 Evraz (LSE: EVR), a steel and mining company headquartered in England

Media
 Eighties Vinyl Records, an English record label
 Equal Vision Records, an American record label
 East Village Radio, an American Internet radio station

Technology
 Electronic Video Recording, a video format developed by CBS Laboratories in the late 1960s
 Enhanced Video Renderer, part of the Microsoft Media Foundation multimedia framework

Transport
 Everett Station, an Amtrak station in Everett, Washington

Railways
 Ecclesbourne Valley Railway, a heritage railway in Derbyshire, England
 Eden Valley Railway, a closed railway in Cumbria, England
 Eden Valley Railway (heritage railway), a heritage railway in Cumbria, England
 Eesti Raudtee, the national railway-company of Estonia
 Elan Valley Railway, a defunct railway in Mid Wales
 Ely Valley Railway, a defunct railway in South Wales
 Esk Valley Railway (Scotland), defunct

People
 Periyar E. V. Ramasamy (1879–1973), Indian Dravidian social activist

Other uses 
 Eco-costs value ratio